Mariansleigh is a village and civil parish in Devon, England.

External links 

 GENUKI Mariansleigh Page

Mariansleigh